Dottie or Dotty is a feminine given name, nickname and stage name.

Dottie may also refer to:
 Tropical Storm Dottie, in the 1976 Atlantic season
 Dottie (album), a 1978 album by Dottie West
 dotty, a graphical user interface for Graphviz, a package of open-source software tools
 Dotty, a 1990 fantasy novel by R. A. Lafferty
 Dotty, also known as Amplify Dot, a British radio DJ and rapper
 Dotty's, a chain of American slot-machine parlors